The Architectural League Prize (formerly known as The Young Architects Forum) is an annual, themed competition and series of lectures and exhibitions organized by the Architectural League of New York and its Young Architects and Designers Committee. "The Prize was established to recognize specific works of high quality and to encourage the exchange of ideas among young people who might otherwise not have a forum."

List of Architectural League Prize winners

2020: Housekeeping

2019: Value

2018: Objective

2017: Authenticity

2016: (im)permanence

2015: Authenticity

2014: Overlay

2013: Range

2012: No Precedent

2011: It’s Different

2010: ReSource

2009: Foresight

2008: Resonance

2007: Proof

2006: Instability

2005: Situating

2004: If…Then

2003: Inhabiting Identity

2002: Material Process

2001: City Limits

2000: Second Nature

1999: Scale

1998: Position/Paradox

1997: Vision Medium Culture

1996: Form

1995: Time

1994: High Definition

1993: 12

1992: On Hold

1991: Practice

1990: Out of Site

1989: Public Work

1988: Hypotheses

1987: Bridges

1986: Behind Closed Doors

1985: Rough Drafts

1984: Kindergarten Chats

1983: Site, Scale and Spectacle

1981(fall): Dwelling in the Cracks: Responses to the City

References

Architecture awards
Architecture lists
